Smesnica is a village in the municipality of Zelenikovo, North Macedonia.

Demographics
As of the 2021 census, Smesnica had 59 residents with the following ethnic composition:
Albanians 45
Persons for whom data are taken from administrative sources 14

According to the 2002 census, the village had a total of 104 inhabitants. Ethnic groups in the village include:
Albanians 104

References

Villages in Zelenikovo Municipality
Albanian communities in North Macedonia